Edward Richard DeChellis (born November 14, 1958) is an American college basketball coach and current head men's basketball coach at the United States Naval Academy.  Previously he was the head coach at Penn State from 2003-2011 and at East Tennessee State from 1996-2003.  At Penn State, DeChellis led the Nittany Lions to an NIT Title in 2009 and an NCAA tournament berth in 2011. DeChellis' years at East Tennessee State yielded three conference division titles and one NCAA tournament berth.  He was named the head coach at Navy in 2011, following the departure of Billy Lange.

DeChellis received the 2009 Big Ten Coach of the Year award and 2006 National Coaches vs. Cancer Man of the Year.  He was born in the Pittsburgh, Pennsylvania suburb of Monaca and has three daughters with his wife Kim.

Coaching
DeChellis was the head coach of the East Tennessee State University Men’s Basketball program from 1996 to 2003, winning three Southern Conference north division titles (2000–03).  Prior to joining East Tennessee State, DeChellis served as an assistant coach at Salem College (WV) and Penn State University.

In 2003, DeChellis inherited a Penn State team that had gone 7–21 the previous two seasons.  In his first two seasons, Penn State won 9 and 7 games, respectively, before finishing 15–15 in 2005–06.  During this time, DeChellis recruited Geary Claxton and Jamelle Cornley to PSU.

Despite DeChellis' widely critiqued decision to release promising sophomore Milos Bogetic from his scholarship, the 2007–08 Nittany Lions entertained hopes of being a dark-horse contender in the Big Ten and possibly even winning enough games to get into the NCAA Tournament. Those hopes were quickly disintegrated when senior forward Geary Claxton went down with an anterior cruciate ligament injury in January. The Lions were plagued with more injuries, when junior forward Jamelle Cornley battled a bruised knee all season. The Lions went 15–16 in the 2007–08 season in a team that started four freshman in the end. Highlights included upset wins over top-10 ranked Michigan State and top-20 ranked Indiana.

DeChellis led the Lions to a 21–10 regular season in 2008–09, equaling the Penn State record for regular-season wins. The Nittany Lions were 10-8 in the  Big Ten, the most for Penn State since 1995–96. DeChellis was named Big Ten Coach of the Year. The Nittany Lions went on to win the 2009 National Invitation Tournament (NIT), the first national tournament title in Penn State Men's Basketball history.

In the 2010-2011 season, DeChellis' Nittany Lions earned a spot in the NCAA tournament, the school's first since 2000-2001. The 10th-seeded Lions fell in the opening round to the 7th-seed Temple Owls.

On May 23, 2011, it was announced that DeChellis would leave Penn State to become the head coach at Navy.

DeChellis holds a bachelor's degree from Penn State University.

Head coaching record

References

External links
 Penn State profile

1958 births
Living people
American men's basketball coaches
Basketball coaches from Pennsylvania
College men's basketball head coaches in the United States
East Tennessee State Buccaneers men's basketball coaches
Navy Midshipmen men's basketball coaches
Penn State Nittany Lions basketball coaches
Pennsylvania State University alumni
People from Monaca, Pennsylvania
Salem Tigers men's basketball coaches
Sportspeople from the Pittsburgh metropolitan area